Helium is the second studio album by the electronic band H3llb3nt. It was released in 1998 on Re-Constriction Records.

Reception 
CMJ critic David Avery gave the album a positive write-up saying "Helium takes the elements industrial holds dear — sinister, breathy vocals, brutal beatscapes and slicing guitar riffs — and augments them with intelligently programmed rhythmss and a wide range of electro influences." Aiding & Abetting was also enthusiastic, saying despite re-using previously released tracks that fans of the band's debut "will find plenty here to get you going once more."

Track listing

Personnel 
Adapted from the Helium liner notes.

H3llb3nt
 Bryan Barton
 Charles Levi
 Jared Louche
 Jordan Nogood – design
 Eric Powell

Additional musicians
 Joel Allard
 Jon Irish
 Jeff Leyda
 Dylan Thomas More
 Ned Wahl
 Rob Williams

Production
 John Golden – engineering, recording, mixing
 H3llb3nt – production, recording, mixing, mastering
 Mike Larson – mastering

Release history

References

External links 
 

1998 albums
H3llb3nt albums
Re-Constriction Records albums